Shubho Drishti was a popular Bengali television soap opera. It premiered on 1 January 2018. It aired on Colors Bangla. It starred Gourab Roy Chowdhury   and Aishwarya Sen in lead roles and Bidipta Chakraborty and Sukanya Goswami in  a negative role. Initially, the show was produced by Shibaji Panja of Vandana Films and Enterprises. Later episodes were produced by Magic Moments Motion Pictures. Prasenjit Chatterjee and Rituparna Sengupta played cameo roles in this serial.

Plot
The journeys of two pairs of siblings – Abir-Drishti and Subho-Antara – lead to a series of tense happenstances. The recent episodes reveal the twists in the plot. It shows the trials and tribulations of unexpected events in the lead pair’s lives in the track where Drishti’s would-be husband Rahul gets kidnapped and Subho gets the blame. Meanwhile, Abir refuses to marry Antara until his sister gets married.

Cast

Main
Gourab Roy Chowdhury as Shubhojit Mukherjee (Subho) / Main Male Lead
Aishwarya Sen as Drishti Subhojit Mukherjee / Main Female Lead
Debarshi Banerjee / Rajib Basu as Abir Basu (Parallel Male Lead) (Dead)
Joyjit Banerjee as Sagnik Sen(Antagonist) 
Oindrilla Bose as Antara Abir Basu / Parallel Female Lead
Bidipta Chakraborty as Annapoorna Mukherjee / Main Female Antagonist
Raj Bhattacharya as Rahul Gupta / Main Male Antagonist
Sukanya Goswami as Sana / Parallel Female Antagonist
Sutirtha Saha as Shoukarjyo/Antara's Childhood Friend /Parallel Male Lead
Sreetama Roychowdhury as Anandi/Antagonist/Drishti's Childhood Friend

Supporting
Sandip Dey as Shekhar Basu(Drishti's Father)
Ranjini Chatterjee as Malini Basu(Drishti's Mother)
Rumpa Chatterjee as Drishti's Aunt(Mashimoni)
Niladri Lahiri as Rajat Deb Roy(Antara's father and Shubho's stepfather)
Abanti Dutta as Krishna Deb Roy(Shubho and Antara's mother)
Saurav Chakraborty as Abhik
Saurav Ghosh as Subho's Assistant
Sukanya Goswami as Sana / Parallel Female Antagonist
Indrakshi Nag as Debjani Chowdhury (Antagonist)
Kausiki Tinni Guha as Soham's Mother
Saugata Bandopadhyay as Soham Sengupta/Drishti 's childhood friend
Rituparna Basak as Septy(Saptaparni)
Somashri Bhattacharyya as Raai
Mousumi Das as Pishimoni (Dead)
Anushka Bhattacharjee as Tinni/Sagnik's Daughter
Shankar Debnath  as Shoukarjyo's father and Sagnik's uncle
Ritoja Majumdar as Shoukarjyo's mother and Sagnik's aunt
Sujata Dawn as Neela/Aditi Mukherjee, sister of Shubho

Guest appearances/Cameo
Prosenjit Chatterjee as Bumba Daa
Rituparna Sengupta as Ritu Di

References

2018 Indian television series debuts
Indian drama television series
Colors Bangla original programming